Christopher Smith (born June 27, 1966) is a former American football tight end. He played college football, originally at Arizona before transferring to Brigham Young (BYU). He was drafted in the 11th round (295th overall) by the Cincinnati Bengals of the National Football League (NFL).

Early years
Smith attended La Cañada High School, where he was an All-California Interscholastic Federation (CIF) in football and track & field. In track, he set a school record in the 400 meters with 47.3 seconds. Smith also competed on a nationally rank 2 mile relay team with members of the LCHS track team, coached by Pat Logan.  His spilt time was 1:49.3.  In football, he played as a wide receiver. While at La Cañada he was also a captain of the track team and Most Valuable Player (MVP) of the football team.

College career
Smith attended the University of Arizona in 1986 before transferring to Brigham Young University. While at BYU, he majored in health care administration.

As a redshirt freshman in 1987, he was the Cougars third-string tight end and played on special teams as well. In 1988, as a redshirt sophomore, he recorded nine receptions for 121 yards and one touchdown. As a redshirt junior in 1989, he was named the team's starting tight end and started all 13 games. He was named First-team All-America by The Sporting News, a Third-team All-American by the Associated Press and First-team All-Western Athletic Conference. He was also featured in an article in Sports Illustrated as a junior who would e turning professional a year early. In 1990, as a redshirt senior, he was a consensus All-American. He recorded 68 passes for 1,156 yards (an NCAA record for tight ends) and two touchdowns. He finished fifth in the nation in receiving yards. His record stood until 2005 when it was broken by Tulsa's Garrett Mills.

In 2011, Smith was ranked the third best tight end in BYU history by the Deseret News, and then in 2015, he was ranked the 27th best football player in school history.

Career statistics

Professional career
Prior to the NFL Draft, Smith attended the NFL Scouting Combine and recorded a 5.05 in the 40-yard dash due to multiple injuries. After which a Sports Illustrated article was published before the draft that included negative quotes. The magazine featured tight end Jerry Evans, who was at the Combine and said of Smith: "He's effeminate. He can't block." NFL scout Dave Te' Thomas added: "I think Chris will look good in a business suit."

Smith was drafted by Cincinnati Bengals in the 11th round (295th overall) of the 1991 NFL draft. However, he was waived during the pre-season.

Personal life
Smith is the son of Robert and Kay Smith. He is one of 10 children. His older brother, Ken, also played for the BYU Cougars as a starting nose guard. Before playing college football, Smith served a mission to Albuquerque, New Mexico from 1985–1987. He married Sarah Newby in April 1989, the couple have three children.

References

External links
 BYU Couars bio

1966 births
Living people
All-American college football players
American football tight ends
BYU Cougars football players
Players of American football from Utah
People from La Cañada Flintridge, California
Latter Day Saint missionaries in the United States
Cincinnati Bengals players